Brian Behrendt (born 24 October 1991) is a German professional footballer  who plays as a centre-back for 2. Bundesliga club Eintracht Braunschweig.

Career
Behrendt started playing football with local clubs Bremervörder SC and TuS Heeslingen. In 2006, he joined the youth ranks of Northern German heavyweight Hamburger SV, but switched to Rapid Wien at the age of 16 when his father moved to Austria for work. He advanced through the club's youth system and made his debut for the second team in a 3–0 win against SV Mattersburg II in Regional League East on 5 March 2010. He joined First League side SV Horn on loan in January 2013 for the remainder of the 2012–13 season.

After returning to Rapid Wien, Behrendt made his first-team debut as an extra-time substitute in an Austrian Cup penalty shootout defeat to LASK Linz on 14 July 2013. He missed most of the 2014–15 season with a broken metatarsal, and he joined Arminia Bielefeld in July 2015.

In December 2020 it was announced Behrendt would move to Eintracht Braunschweig in January 2021, having agreed a contract until summer 2023.

References

External links
 

1991 births
Living people
People from Bremervörde
Association football defenders
German footballers
TuS Heeslingen players
SK Rapid Wien players
SV Horn players
Arminia Bielefeld players
Eintracht Braunschweig players
Austrian Football Bundesliga players
Bundesliga players
2. Bundesliga players
Footballers from Lower Saxony